Wrekmeister Harmonies, led by musician and composer JR Robinson, is an experimental music collective.  Named after the Béla Tarr movie Werckmeister Harmonies, it combines elements of drone music, serialism, post-rock, and  heavy metal. Wrekmeister Harmonies typically performs a single composition, often almost an hour in length, beginning with a slow build, shifting into a cathartic middle section, concluding with either a peaceful or disquieting resolution.

Critical response
In 2013, Wrekmeister Harmonies was signed to independent label Thrill Jockey,  toured internationally with  Grails and headlined in Europe.

Wrekmeister Harmonies' albums have been featured in year-end lists of major publications and were praised by music critics. Saby Reyes-Kulkarni of Pitchfork Media rated "Night of Your Ascension" as 7.8/10 and listed it among his top ten metal albums of 2015. John Doran of The Quietus included "Then It All Came Down" among his "Quietus Albums of the Year 2014".  Spin selected “You've Always Meant So Much to Me” as one of the “20 Best Metal Albums of 2013,” and Grayson Currin of Pitchfork rated the album as 7.9/10.  Andy Gensler of the Village Voice listed “Recordings Made in Public Spaces” as one of the top 10 Pazz and Jop albums of 2009.

Notable venues
Wrekmeister Harmonies is known for bringing major metal artists to perform in unconventional venues, such as the Andy Warhol Museum, the Solomon R. Guggenheim Museum, the J. Paul Getty Museum, the Pompidou Center, the  Museum of Contemporary Art in Chicago, the Golden Gate Bridge in San Francisco and Chicago's  Bohemian National Cemetery.

Individuals associated with Wrekmeister Harmonies
 JR Robinson
 The Body
 Esther Shaw
  Jef Whitehead
  Sanford Parker
 Mark Solotroff
  Bruce Lamont
 Jaime Fennelly
 Nandini Khaund
 Billie Howard
 Chanel Pease
 Andrew Markuszewski
 Lydia Lane Stout
 Kate Spelling
 Solomon Snyder
 Anne Patterson
 Tom Hernández
 Fred Lonberg-Holm
 Julie Pomerleau
 Chris Brokaw
 David Yow
 Ken Vandermark
 Keefe Jackson

Discography
 Recordings Made in Public Spaces, Volume 1 (2009) Atavistic
 You've Always Meant So Much to Me (2013) Thrill Jockey
 Then It All Came Down (2014) Thrill Jockey
 Night of Your Ascension (2015) Thrill Jockey
 Light Falls (2016) Thrill Jockey
 The Alone Rush (2018) Thrill Jockey
 We Love to Look at the Carnage (2020) Thrill Jockey

References

Musicians from Chicago
Experimental musical groups